Planetary Confinement is the third album by the UK band Antimatter, released in 2005.

Track listing

Credits

English Sessions

The Weight of the World
Epitaph
A Portrait of the Young Man As An Artist
Legions

An acoustic performance recorded in Studio 33, Liverpool, July 2004. 
All songs and orchestral arrangements by Mick Moss

Mick Moss - Acoustic guitars, Vocals
Rachel Brewster - Violins
Stephen Hughes - Bass Guitar
Chris Phillips - Drums
Sue Marshall - Additional vocals on 'Legions'

Irish Sessions

Planetary Confinement
Line of Fire
Mr. White
Relapse
Eternity part 24

All songs by Duncan Patterson, except 'Mr. White' by Trouble

Duncan Patterson - piano, acoustic guitars, bass guitar, keyboards
Amélie Festa - vocals
Mehdi Messouci - additional keyboards on 'Relapse'
Barry Whyte - lead guitar
Alex Mazarguil - djembe
Michael Cronin - drums
Album mastered at Counterpoint Studio by Gianni Skolnick
Cover design by Mick Moss from an original photograph by Brandon Stone
Inner photos by Chris Slack 
Design by Mick Moss
Layout by Paul Kuhr

Notes
"Mr White" was originally performed by the doom metal band Trouble.
"Eternity Part 24" is a continuation of the tracks "Eternity Part I", "Eternity Part II", and "Eternity Part III", the three of which appear on Eternity, an album released by Patterson's previous band Anathema.

References

2005 albums
The End Records albums
Antimatter (band) albums